House on Wheels is a South Korean variety show featuring Sung Dong-il, Kim Hee-won with Yeo Jin-goo in the first season, Im Si-wan in the second season, Gong Myung in the third season and Rowoon in the fourth season.

The first season premiered on tvN on June 11, 2020 and aired every Thursday at 21:00 (KST). The second season aired every Friday at 21:10 (KST) starting from April 9, 2022. The third season premiered in October 2021 and broadcast every Thursday at 20:40 (KST). The fourth season is slated to release on October 13, 2022 and broadcast every Thursday at 20:40 (KST).

Synopsis
Three actors travel across South Korea in a wheeled house and invite guests to stay with them for a night or two.

Cast
 Sung Dong-il 
 Kim Hee-won 
 Yeo Jin-goo (Season 1)
 Im Si-wan (Season 2)
 Gong Myung (Season 3)
 Rowoon (Season 4)

Episodes

Series overview

Season 1 (2020)

Season 2 (2021)

Season 3 (2021–2022)

Season 4 (2022)

Viewership

References

External links
 Official Website (season 1) 
 Official Website (season 2) 
 Official Website (season 3) 

TVN (South Korean TV channel) original programming
2020 South Korean television series debuts
South Korean reality television series
South Korean travel television series
South Korean television shows
Korean-language television shows